Travante António Williams (born July 29, 1993) is an American-born naturalized Portuguese professional basketball player who plays for Sporting CP.

Before going to Portugal, Travante played for the San Francisco Rams, the Adams State Grizzlies and the Alaska Nanooks.

Honours
Oliveirense
 Portuguese League: 2017–18, 2018–19
 Portuguese League Cup: 2019
 Portuguese Supercup: 2018

Sporting
 Portuguese League: 2020–21
 Portuguese Cup: 2020, 2021
 Portuguese League Cup: 2022, 2023
 Portuguese Supercup: 2021, 2022

References

1993 births
Living people
Sportspeople from Anchorage, Alaska
Basketball players from Alaska
American men's basketball players
Sporting CP basketball players
Small forwards

American emigrants to Portugal
Naturalised citizens of Portugal